"Ain't You" is a song by American R&B singer K. Michelle. It was released on February 12, 2016, as the second single from her third studio album, More Issues Than Vogue (2016).

Critical reception
The song received positive reviews from music critic's. Fuse reviewed the song stating "Ain't You" was "a soul-bearing affair, in which the singer gripes about the emotional pain and pitfalls of romance. She sings as part of the chorus: "Baby I ain't tryin' to change you" over an atmospheric beat that features a thumping snare drum." Rap-Up reviewed the song "On the honest and soulful ballad, the Jack Daniels spokeswoman keeps it 100 as she sings about relationship drama. “I done dodged so many ceremonies / Could have had 50 mill in alimony / Give you everything, what you want from me, you know,” she sings."

Music video
The music video for the song premiered on June 8, 2016.

Chart performance
"Ain't You" debuted at number 41 on US Billboard R&B/Hip-Hop Digital Songs on March 5, 2016.

Charts

References

2016 singles
2016 songs
Atlantic Records singles
K. Michelle songs
Songs written by Jeremih
Songs written by Hitmaka
Song recordings produced by Yung Berg
Songs written by Michael Hernandez (songwriter)
Songs written by Oz (record producer)